Joseph Lyng (born 10 April 1991) is an Irish hurler who currently plays as a midfielder for the Kilkenny senior team.

Born in Inistioge, County Kilkenny, Lyng first played competitive hurling in his youth. He enjoyed Leinster success at colleges level with Good Counsel College. An All-Ireland medallist in the intermediate with Rower–Inistioge, Lyng has also won one Leinster medal and one championship medal. 

Lyng made his debut on the inter-county scene at the age of eighteen when he first linked up with the Kilkenny minor team. An All-Ireland runner-up in this grade, he was later an All-Ireland runner-up with the under-21 team and an All-Ireland runner-up with the intermediate team. Lyng joined the extended senior panel during the 2014 championship.

His acting success include playing Lorcan Meehan, son of Carol Meehan in Fair City from 2002 to 2007.

Honours

Team

Good Counsel College
Leinster Colleges Senior Hurling Championship (1): 2009

Rower–Inistioge
All-Ireland Intermediate Club Hurling Championship (1): 2014
Leinster Intermediate Club Hurling Championship (1): 2013
Kilkenny Intermediate Hurling Championship (1): 2013

Kilkenny 
Leinster Intermediate Hurling Championship (1): 2012
Leinster Under-21 Hurling Championship (1): 2012
Leinster Minor Hurling Championship (1): 2009

References

1991 births
Living people
Rower-Inistioge hurlers
Kilkenny inter-county hurlers
Irish male soap opera actors